Wendall is a given name. Wendall (also used as a girl's name), is related to the Old German name Wendell. The meaning of Wendall is "wanderer". Notable people with the name include:

 Edward Wendall Kelly (1880–?), American Methodist bishop
 Chummy Broomhall (1919–2017), American cross country skier
 Wendall Williams (born 1990), American football player

See also
 Wendel (disambiguation)
 Wendell (disambiguation)